Stephan is an unincorporated community and census-designated place (CDP) in Hyde County, South Dakota, United States. Stephan has been assigned the ZIP code of 57346. The population of the CDP was 68 at the 2020 census.

Some say Stephan was named in honor of the martyred Saint Stephan, while others believe the community has the name of Monsignor J. A. Stephan, a local missionary.

The tribal K-12 school Crow Creek Tribal School, affiliated with the Bureau of Indian Education (BIE), is in the settlement.

Demographics

References

Unincorporated communities in Hyde County, South Dakota
Unincorporated communities in South Dakota